= Shep diagram =

A Shep Diagram is a series of video or animated image clips of an athlete, layered into a single composite image for the purposes of contrasting the similarities of movements with the different outcomes. It was originally created by Drew Sheppard to demonstrate the constant release point of Texas Rangers starting pitcher Yu Darvish despite the different speeds and locations of the pitches from that release point. Soon after, MLB Network used a similar process to show the same for Detroit Tigers pitcher Justin Verlander. On May 4, Drew Sheppard announced the development of a partnership with FanGraphs.com to produce additional animations.
